The boys' 10 kilometre classical cross-country skiing competition at the 2020 Winter Youth Olympics was held on 21 January at the Vallée de Joux Cross-Country Centre.

Results
The race was started at 13:00.

References

Boys' 10 kilometre classical